The following list is a list of the works contained in the Lingbao Canon as listed by Lu Xiujing in his catalogue of the Lingbao School, China, in 437 CE.

Notes

References 

Taoist texts